Musa Mirzapayazovich Adyshev was a Soviet and Kyrgyz geologist who lived and worked in Kyrgyzstan. He is best known for identification of Tien Shan black-shale province and substantiation of its stratigraphic location.

Biography

After graduation from Central Asian State University in Tashkent in 1947 he worked in the Institute of Geology of Kyrgyz branch of Academy of Sciences of the Soviet Union.

In 1953-1974 he was a director of the Institute of Geology, in 1957-1979 - member of Board, since 1974 - vice president, and in 1978 the president of the Academy of Sciences of Kyrgyz SSR (presently Kyrgyz Academy of Sciences).

Legacy and honors

Organizations named after academician M.Adyshev
 Institute of Geology of the Kyrgyz Academy of Science
 In 2004 Osh Technological Institute

Geographic places
 Range and peak in southern Kyrgyzstan

References

1915 births
1979 deaths
Soviet geologists
National University of Uzbekistan alumni
Recipients of the Order of the Red Banner of Labour
Kyrgyzstani geologists